"Don't Cha Wanna Ride" is a song by English singer and songwriter Joss Stone from her second studio album, Mind Body & Soul (2004). The track was written by Stone, Desmond Child, Betty Wright, Steve Greenberg, and Michael Mangini and is based upon a sample from the 1968 song "Soulful Strut" by Chicago-based soul and jazz instrumental group Young-Holt Unlimited. The song was first serviced to US radio on 26 July 2004, then was issued physically in the United Kingdom on 4 July 2005 as the fourth and final single from the album. The song was later included on the 2011 compilation album The Best of Joss Stone 2003–2009.

Critical reception
Caroline Sullivan of The Guardian wrote that on "Don't Cha Wanna Ride", Stone "works up a decent head of hands-in-the-air funk." Blenders Robert Christgau felt that the song "split the difference between guaranteed hook appeal and a decent simulation of emotional truth." Although calling it a "neo soul hip-shaker", Laura Sinagra of Rolling Stone considered the song to be "more Destiny's Child than yesterday's blues." David Browne of Entertainment Weekly stated that Mind, Body & Soul'''s "one attempt at sauciness, 'Don't Cha Wanna Ride,' in which Stone [...] compares herself to a juiced-up car, should be parked in the lingerie section of a department store."

Chart performance
"Don't Cha Wanna Ride" debuted and peaked at number 20 on the UK Singles Chart the week of 16 July 2005, spending four weeks on the chart and becoming Mind, Body & Souls second highest-charting single after "You Had Me". Internationally the single underperformed the charts in Germany and Switzerland, but proved to be somewhat successful in the Netherlands, where it reached number 24 (as did its predecessor, "Spoiled"), and Italy, where it reached number 38.

Music video

The music video for "Don't Cha Wanna Ride", directed by Wayne Isham, was shot in Santa Monica, California, and released in June 2005. It features scenes of Stone driving a white, floral-print Volkswagen Beetle 1302 Cabriolet along the Pacific Coast Highway and performing with her band at the Santa Monica Pier at dusk.

Track listingsUK CD single and 7-inch picture disc "Don't Cha Wanna Ride" – 3:31
 "The Right Time" – 3:50UK DVD single "Don't Cha Wanna Ride"  – 3:31
 "Right to Be Wrong"  – 4:30
 "Spoiled"  – 5:38European CD single "Don't Cha Wanna Ride" – 3:31
 "Spoiled"  – 5:38
 "Fell in Love with a Boy"  – 4:14

PersonnelMusicians Joss Stone – lead vocals, backing vocals
 AJ Nilo – guitar
 Jonathan Joseph – drums
 Michael Mangini – bass, keyboards
 Raymond Angry – piano, Hammond organ
 Tom "Bones" Malone – baritone saxophone, tenor saxophone, trombone, trumpet
 Betty Wright – backing vocals
 Bombshell – backing vocalsProduction'''
 Michael Mangini – producer, mixing, programming
 Steve Greenberg – producer
 Betty Wright – producer
 Steve Greenwell – engineer, mixing, programming

Charts

Release history

References

2004 songs
2005 singles
Joss Stone songs
Music videos directed by Wayne Isham
Relentless Records singles
Songs written by Betty Wright
Songs written by Desmond Child
Songs written by Eugene Record
Songs written by Joss Stone
Virgin Records singles